Casale Monferrato railway station is the main station of Casale Monferrato, in the Piedmont region of north-west Italy, and is now the only one at which passenger trains stop.

Overview
It is located in Piazza Vittorio Veneto, close to the city's principal public gardens, and to the east of the city centre. The station previously provided access to three railway lines: Asti – Mortara, Vercelli–Casale Monferrato and Chivasso–Alessandria: of these only the last remains active.
On 6 July 1870 the line between Mortara and Asti opened; it was extended to Castagnole six days later. In April 1887, completion of track between Castelrosso and Casale Popolo brought about a direct connection to Chivasso.
On 6 July 1870 the line between Mortara and Asti opened; it was extended to Castagnole six days later. In April 1887, completion of track between Castelrosso and Casale Popolo brought about a direct connection to Chivasso.

Today the station is managed by Rete Ferroviaria Italiana which classifies it under the silver category. Services provided include a ticket office, a bar, a news-stand and toilets. The platforms are connected by a pedestrian underpass. Parking and bus services are available close to the station.

Gallery

See also

History of rail transport in Italy
List of railway stations in Piedmont
Rail transport in Italy
Railway stations in Italy

Notes

This article includes material sourced from its counterpart in the Italian Wikipedia, ‘Stazione di Casale Monferrato’, in the version current on 1 December 2010

External links

Casale Monferrato
Railway stations in Piedmont
Railway stations opened in 1857
1857 establishments in Italy
Buildings and structures in Casale Monferrato
Railway stations in Italy opened in the 19th century